Alexandro Silva de Sousa (born 15 April 1983), known as Dudu Cearense or simply Dudu, is a Brazilian former professional footballer.

He is known for his passing, aerial ability and tackling. He was a central midfielder who usually played either in a holding midfield role or as a box-to-box midfielder. Despite often being used in a defensive position, he was mainly an attacking player. He has been capped for the Brazil national team.

Career
Dudu was born in Fortaleza, Ceará.

In 2007, Dudu expressed his wish to leave CSKA Moscow. Olympiacos tried to sign him, but failed. In 2008, Olympiacos offered the Russian club €6 million. The offer was accepted and the player signed a three-year contract on 6 August 2008. In May 2009, he signed a new contract with the Greek club which would last until June 2013 with a buyout clause of €8.5 million.

On 7 April 2011, Olympiacos agreed to sell Dudu Cearense to Atlético Mineiro for a fee of €1.1 million. Dudu signed a three-year contract with the Brazilian team. In 2012 he moved to Goiás until the end of his contract in January 2014. Goiás wanted to extend with the player but he wanted to return to Europe. On 27 January 2014, he agreed a 1.5-year contract with Greek Club OFI.

On 5 June 2014, he agreed for a one-year contract worth $245,000 with Maccabi Netanya of the Israel Premier League (biggest contract in the history of the club). Three weeks later, it was reported Dudu was injured and in poor shape. He was released on 22 September. He never played for Netanya in the league and only made two appearances in the Toto Cup. He is considered the biggest flop in the club's history, mainly for the fact he never even played once in the league and the club had to pay $50,000 compensation after his release.

On 10 January 2015, he returned to Brazil and agreed to a contract with Fortaleza.

Career statistics

Club

International

Honours

Club
Vitória
Supercampeonato Baiano Winner: 2002
Campeonato Baiano Winner: 2002, 2003
Copa do Nordeste Winner: 2003

CSKA Moscow
Russian Premier League Winner: 2005, 2006
Russian Super Cup Winner: 2006, 2007
Russian Cup Winner: 2005/2006, 2008

Olympiacos
Greek Super League Winner:2009, 2011
Greek Cup Winner: 2009

Atlético Mineiro
Campeonato Mineiro: 2012

Goiás
Campeonato Brasileiro Série B: 2012
Goiás State League: 2013

Fortaleza
 Campeonato Cearense: 2016

Botafogo
 Campeonato Carioca: 2018

International
Brazil
Copa América Winner: 2004

Brazil U-20
FIFA World Youth Championship Winner: 2003

Individual
FIFA World Youth Championship Golden Shoe: 2003
FIFA World Youth Championship Silver Ball: 2003

References

External links
 
 
 

1983 births
Living people
Association football midfielders
Brazilian footballers
Brazilian expatriate footballers
PFC CSKA Moscow players
J1 League players
Kashiwa Reysol players
Stade Rennais F.C. players
Olympiacos F.C. players
Campeonato Brasileiro Série A players
Campeonato Brasileiro Série B players
Campeonato Brasileiro Série C players
Esporte Clube Vitória players
Clube Atlético Mineiro players
Goiás Esporte Clube players
OFI Crete F.C. players
Maccabi Netanya F.C. players
Fortaleza Esporte Clube players
Botafogo de Futebol e Regatas players
Expatriate footballers in France
Expatriate footballers in Russia
Expatriate footballers in Greece
Expatriate footballers in Israel
Expatriate footballers in Japan
Brazil under-20 international footballers
Brazil international footballers
2003 FIFA Confederations Cup players
2004 Copa América players
Sportspeople from Fortaleza
Ligue 1 players
Russian Premier League players
Super League Greece players
Israeli Premier League players
Copa América-winning players
Pan American Games medalists in football
Pan American Games silver medalists for Brazil
Footballers at the 2003 Pan American Games
Medalists at the 2003 Pan American Games